Laccotriton is an extinct genus of prehistoric salamanders which lived in Eastern Asia during the Late Jurassic. A nearly complete skeleton of L. subsolanus was found at Hebei, China.

See also

 List of prehistoric amphibians

References

Jurassic salamanders
Prehistoric amphibians of Asia
Late Jurassic amphibians
Fossil taxa described in 1998